Kliment is a male given name, a Slavic form of the Late Latin name Clement. A diminutive form is Klim. Notable people:

 Kliment Boyadzhiev (1861—1933), Bulgarian general during the Balkan Wars and World War I
 Kliment Kolesnikov (born 2000), Russian swimmer
 Klyment Kvitka (1880—1953), Ukrainian musicologist and ethnographer
 Kliment Nastoski (born 1987), Macedonian footballer
 Kliment Red'ko (1897—1956), Russian avant-garde painter
 Kliment Smoliatich, Ancient Rus Orthodox metropolitan bishop (1147—1155)
 Kliment of Tarnovo (1841—1901), Bulgarian clergyman and politician
 Kliment Taseski (born 1991), Australian footballer
 Kliment Timiryazev (1843—1920), Russian botanist and physiologist, promoter of Darwinism
 Kliment Voroshilov (1881—1969), Soviet military officer and politician, Marshal of the Soviet Union

See also 
 Jan Kliment (born 1 September 1993), Czech footballer
 Clement of Ohrid
 Klimenti, Albanian clan

References 

Slavic masculine given names
Bulgarian masculine given names
Czech masculine given names
Macedonian masculine given names
Russian masculine given names
Ukrainian masculine given names